Alfred Karl Neuland (10 October 1895 – 16 November 1966) was an Estonian weightlifter. He competed in the 1920 and 1924 Olympics and won a gold and a silver medal, respectively, becoming the first Olympic gold medalist from Estonia. He won a world title in 1922, and set three ratified world records in 1920–23: one in the snatch and two in the clean and jerk.

Born in Walk (Valga), Governorate of Livonia Neuland studied in Riga, Latvia, and Saint Petersburg, Russia. He took up weightlifting relatively early, and placed second at the Russian championships in 1913 and 1914; he won the Russian lightweight title in 1915 and middleweight title in 1916. Neuland then fought in World War I and in the Estonian War of Independence, and after demobilization he won Estonian weightlifting titles in 1921, 1923 and 1924. After that he retired from competitions and worked as a businessman, weightlifting coach and referee in his hometown of Valga from 1921 to 1940. From 1950 to 1955, Neuland headed the Estonian Experimental Soft Drinks Factory in Tallinn. In 1995 a monument in his honor was installed in Valga, and since 2000 an annual memorial weightlifting tournament has been held there.

References

External links
 
 
 
 

1895 births
1966 deaths
Sportspeople from Valga, Estonia
People from the Governorate of Livonia
Estonian male weightlifters
Olympic gold medalists for Estonia
Olympic silver medalists for Estonia
Weightlifters at the 1920 Summer Olympics
Weightlifters at the 1924 Summer Olympics
Olympic weightlifters of Estonia
Olympic medalists in weightlifting
Medalists at the 1924 Summer Olympics
Medalists at the 1920 Summer Olympics
Burials at Metsakalmistu
20th-century Estonian people